Milford Mills was a village in the Marsh Creek Valley of Chester County, Pennsylvania that was inundated by the construction of the Marsh Creek Dam in 1972.

Milford Mills was one of several farming villages settled by Welsh, Scots-Irish and English in the first quarter of the 18th century in Upper Uwchlan Township. Like nearby Lyndell and Dorlan, Milford Mills grew during the 19th century as paper and textile manufacturing flourished. Bypassed by large-scale industry in the late 19th century, the region reverted to an agricultural economy until after World War II when the Pennsylvania Turnpike brought suburban development to northwestern Chester County.

In 1961, the Pennsylvania Department of Forests and Waters selected the Marsh Creek Valley as favorable location for a flood control and drinking water reservoir to serve the Brandywine River Valley. Despite protests from some residents, the State of Pennsylvania acquired 34 properties throughout the region for the project, razing the village and nearby woodlands. In 1972, the earthen Marsh Creek Dam was completed, standing at 89 feet (27 m) high and 990 feet (301 m) long. Today the site of Milford Mills lies beneath the  Marsh Creek Lake: part of a water management project operated by the Chester County Water Resources Authority and the State of Pennsylvania.

Abandoned roads and traces of houses, barns and other structures can be seen on the shores of the lake and in adjacent recreation areas in Marsh Creek State Park.

Gallery

References

Geography of Chester County, Pennsylvania
Ghost towns in Pennsylvania
Unincorporated communities in Pennsylvania